Francisco Bautista (born September 17, 1972 in Contla de Juan Cuamatzi, Tlaxcala) is a Mexican long-distance runner. He represented his native country at the 2008 Summer Olympics in Beijing, PR China, where he finished in 66th place in the men's marathon event, clocking 2:29.28. Bautista set his personal best (2:11.44) in the marathon on March 7, 2004 in Torreón.

Achievements

References
 
 

1978 births
Living people
Mexican male long-distance runners
Sportspeople from Tlaxcala
Athletes (track and field) at the 2003 Pan American Games
Athletes (track and field) at the 2007 Pan American Games
Pan American Games competitors for Mexico
Athletes (track and field) at the 2008 Summer Olympics
Olympic athletes of Mexico
21st-century Mexican people